Christine Grace Payne (born 30 December 1956) is a British former trade union leader.

Payne graduated from Loughborough University and studied industrial relations at Middlesex Polytechnic. In 1979, she began working for the trade union Equity, becoming the television commercials organiser in 1981. She served as Assistant Secretary (Recorded Performance) between 1991 and 1999, when she became Assistant General Secretary (Live Performance).

In 2005 Payne was elected as the union's General Secretary, becoming the first woman to lead the union.

Under Payne's leadership, membership of Equity grew from just over 35,000 in 2005, to just under 49,000 in 2020. She served on the Executive Committee of the International Federation of Actors, and the General Council of the Trades Union Congress.

Payne was re-elected unopposed as general secretary in 2010 and 2015, retiring in 2020.

References

1956 births
Living people
Alumni of Loughborough University
Alumni of Middlesex University
General Secretaries of Equity (trade union)
Members of the General Council of the Trades Union Congress
Women trade unionists